St. Joseph's Convent is a Roman Catholic secondary school for girls located in Castries, Saint Lucia.

The school was founded in 1854 by the Sisters of St. Joseph of Cluny.

Notable alumnae
Suzie d'Auvergne, High Court Judge
Dame Pearlette Louisy, Governor General of Saint Lucia
Gale Rigobert, Member of Parliament for Micoud North

In the media
St. Joseph's was the main setting for the second episode of " Extreme School ", a CBBC show about badly behaving British students sent to strict forgone schools for a week

References

Buildings and structures in Castries
Educational institutions established in 1854
Schools in Saint Lucia
1854 establishments in the British Empire